Events in the year 2018 in Uruguay.

Incumbents
 President: Tabaré Vázquez
 Vice President: Lucía Topolansky

Events

Deaths

30 April – Elisa Izaurralde, biochemist and molecular biologist (b. 1959).
12 July – José Omar Verdún, footballer (b. 1945).
2 October – Hermenegildo Sábat, journalist and comic book artist (b. 1933).

References

 
2010s in Uruguay
Years of the 21st century in Uruguay
Uruguay
Uruguay